Munich Karlsplatz is an underground S-Bahn and U-Bahn station  below the Karlsplatz in central Munich. It is one of the busiest stations in Munich, as it is located at the western end of Munich's Altstadt (Old Town).

Karlsplatz is also a stop on the Munich tramway, located on the Altstadtring, the Old Town's periphery road.

The underground facilities were built as part of the S-Bahn tunnel through central Munich in the early 1970s.

Levels 
The station is divided into five levels.

Level 1 (Stachus Passagen)
The first level, just below road level, is home to a large shopping mall (the Stachus Passagen) which is due for renovation in the next years. Large shops have branches here, for instance Kaufhof or Woolworths.

Level 2 
Level two has a branch of the Stadtsparkasse, a large local bank, as well as ticket counters and eateries.

Level 3  
The third level holds the S-Bahn station with two tracks and three platforms, arranged in the Spanish solution: The island platform is for boarding only and the side platforms are for disembarking.

Level 4 
The fourth level allows interchange between the S-Bahn and U-Bahn.

Level 5 
The fifth level holds the U-Bahn station with two tracks and two platforms. Lines  and  call here, travelling in north-west direction. The station is the deepest in the whole network and also has the longest escalator.

References

External links 
 
 
 
 
 

Karlsplatz
Karlsplatz
Karlsplatz
Railway stations in Germany opened in 1972
Railway stations in Germany opened in 1984
1972 establishments in West Germany
1984 establishments in West Germany